Daniel J. Venters is a former justice of the Kentucky Supreme Court. He was appointed to the bench in 2008, and his term ended in 2018. He has previously sat on the District Court for Pulaski and Rockcastle counties and as a Circuit Court Judge for Pulaski, Lincoln and Rockcastle counties. He is a graduate of the University of Kentucky College of Law.

References

Justices of the Kentucky Supreme Court
University of Kentucky College of Law alumni
Living people
Year of birth missing (living people)
Place of birth missing (living people)
21st-century American judges